Landry Mulemo (born 17 September 1986 in Liège, Belgium) is a Congolese professional footballer.

Career
Mulemo began his career with Standard Liège as a youth team player where he played for two years before signing with FC Flémalle in 1992. After three years with FC Flémalle he returned, in the summer 1995, to Standard Liège.

After nine years at Standard Liège, in July 2004, he moved to Sint-Truidense on loan. He played sixty five games, scoring one goal and in July 2007 again returned to play for Standard Liège. On 22 June 2010 Bucaspor signed the Democratic Republic of the Congo left-back from Standard Liège on a one-year contract.

In January 2016, Swiss third division side Servette FC announced that Landry Mulemo was spending three days on trial with them

On 27 January 2020, Mulemo returned to the pitch after two years without club, signing with Belgian club UR Namur, where he also was named captain. The club announced his departure in August 2020.

International career
Mulemo has played in the Belgium U-21 team and was in the team which played in the 2007 UEFA European Under-21 Football Championship in the Netherlands. He has also represented the Belgium U-23
team at 2008 Summer Olympics in Beijing.

Mulemo plays since 2011 for DR Congo at senior level and played a FIFA World Cup qualifier match against Swaziland on 11 November 2011.

Honours
Standard Liège
Belgian First Division: 2007–08, 2008–09
Belgian Supercup: 2008, 2009

References

External links
 
 
 Profile on footgoal.net
 kicker Profile 
 
 

1986 births
Living people
Footballers from Liège
Belgian people of Democratic Republic of the Congo descent
Belgian footballers
Association football defenders
Belgium youth international footballers
Belgium under-21 international footballers
Footballers at the 2008 Summer Olympics
Olympic footballers of Belgium
Democratic Republic of the Congo footballers
2013 Africa Cup of Nations players
Democratic Republic of the Congo international footballers
Standard Liège players
Sint-Truidense V.V. players
Bucaspor footballers
K.V. Kortrijk players
Beitar Jerusalem F.C. players
Kaposvári Rákóczi FC players
KF Vllaznia Shkodër players
Birkirkara F.C. players
Belgian Pro League players
Süper Lig players
Israeli Premier League players
Nemzeti Bajnokság I players
Democratic Republic of the Congo expatriate footballers
Expatriate footballers in Belgium
Expatriate footballers in Turkey
Expatriate footballers in Israel
Expatriate footballers in Hungary
Expatriate footballers in Albania
Expatriate footballers in Malta
Democratic Republic of the Congo expatriate sportspeople in Belgium
Democratic Republic of the Congo expatriate sportspeople in Turkey
Democratic Republic of the Congo expatriate sportspeople in Israel
Democratic Republic of the Congo expatriate sportspeople in Hungary
Democratic Republic of the Congo expatriate sportspeople in Albania
Democratic Republic of the Congo expatriate sportspeople in Malta
Maltese Premier League players